Zsolt László Becsey (born 12 January 1964 in Szeged)
is a Hungarian politician and former Member of the European Parliament (MEP) with the Fidesz, part of the European People's Party. He sat on the European Parliament's Committee on Economic and Monetary Affairs.

Becsey was also a substitute for the Committee on Transport and Tourism, substitute for the Delegation to the EU-Croatia Joint Parliamentary Committee.

From 2010 to 2011, Becsey served as State Secretary for Foreign Economic Relations in the Ministry of National Economy.

Education
 1988: Karl Marx University of Economics, university diploma
 1988: Desk officer with responsibility for the Council of Europe, Ministry of Foreign Affairs
 1991: Secretary, Hungary's Representation to the EU, Brussels
 Ministry of Foreign Affairs
 1999: Deputy head, Hungary's Representation to the EU, Brussels

See also
 2004 European Parliament election in Hungary

Personal life
He is married and has three children.

References

External links
 
 

1964 births
Living people
People from Szeged
Fidesz MEPs
MEPs for Hungary 2004–2009
Corvinus University of Budapest alumni